Cristina Martínez can refer to:

 Cristina Martínez (canoeist) (born 1972), Spanish canoeist
 Cristina Martínez (cyclist) (born 1996), Spanish cyclist
 Cristina Martinez (singer), vocalist for Boss Hog
 Cristina E. Martinez, LGBT activist in Texas
 Cristina Martinez (chef), chef in Philadelphia